La Salle Secondary School, Kota Kinabalu (Malay: Sekolah Menengah La Salle Kota Kinabalu) is a co-educational secondary school for boys and girls (mostly boys) and one of the oldest schools in Kota Kinabalu on the coast of Borneo in East Malaysia.

It was established in 1953 by Rev. Fr. Bernard Davies, a Mill Hill Missionary. Despite being an all-boys mission school, the students consist of all races regardless of religion.

The school is divided into two pieces of land. The Senior Block (form 4 to Form 6), remains at its current location. The Junior Block (Form 1 to Form 3) has been relocated to the new ground to accommodate the increase in student enrolment.

The single-session secondary school is located in Tanjung Aru. It is a few minutes walk from Pekan Tanjung Aru. Next to the Senior Block is SM Stella Maris.

History 
La Salle Secondary School Kota Kinabalu was established in July 1903 as Sacred Heart Primary School by Father Van Der Heyden.  By June 1913, the school had around 50 students which increased to 215 by the year 1923. Between 1941 and 1945, a wooden school building with eight classes was built on the site where the current Sacred Heart Primary School stands.

In the early 1950s, the Catholic Mission started the Sacred Heart secondary school and Father Bernard Davies who served as its first principal. In 1953, the Catholic Mission obtained 3 hectares of land in Tanjung Aru and moved the school to its present location.

By 1958, the La Salle Brothers took over the management of the school with Brother Raphael Egan being the first principal. On 22 May 1958, Sacred Heart Secondary School was subsequently renamed La Salle Secondary School. This name was derived from the founder, Jean Baptiste de La Salle.

The school is affiliated to other Lasallian educational institutions in Malaysia.

Principals 
 Rev. Fr. Bernard Davies, M.H.M. (1952–1954)
 Rev. Fr. Arthur Crowther, M.H.M. (1955–1958)
 Bro. Raphael Eagan, FSC (1958–1966)
 Bro. Brendan Dunne, FSC (1966–1968)
 Bro. Datuk Charles Michael O’Leary, FSC, PGDK (1968–1985)
 Mr. Stanley Liew Hyuk Hiong (1986–1999)
 Dr. Edward Miku Tionsu (2000–2003)
 Mdm. Katherine Philip (2004–2006)
 Mdm. Julia Willie Jock, ADK, ASDK (2006–2016)
 Mdm. Mary Macdalena A. Komuji (2016–2022)

Notable alumni
 Bernard Dompok – former state chief minister
 James Wong Chye Fook – former Malaysian footballer
 Peter Mojuntin – late former state cabinet Minister who perished in the Double Six Crash
 John Lee Hiong Fun-Yit Yaw – Retired Archbishop of Kota Kinabalu Archdiocese
 Richard Malanjum – Chief Justice of Malaysia from 2018 to 2019
 Salleh Sulong – late former state cabinet Minister who was also a victim of the Double Six Crash
 Peter Rajah – former Malaysian goalkeeper
 Joseph Pairin Kitingan – former Chief Minister of Sabah
 Ahmadshah Abdullah – State Governor from 2003 to 2010

See also 
 List of schools in Sabah
 Lists of schools in Malaysia

References

External links 
 
 De La Salle Brothers Sabah

Buildings and structures in Kota Kinabalu
Schools in Sabah
Lasallian schools in Malaysia
Secondary schools in Malaysia
Catholic schools in Malaysia